Michael Jerome Reed (born August 16, 1972) is an American football coach and former player who is currently the special teams coordinator and cornerbacks coach at Clemson University. He previously served as an assistant coach at North Carolina State University, Philadelphia Eagles, University of Richmond and Kiel Baltic Hurricanes.

Playing career
Reed played college football at Boston College for four seasons. Reed was drafted in the seventh round of the 1995 NFL Draft as the final pick of the expansion Carolina Panthers making him Mr. Irrelevant. He played in three games (one in 1995 and two in 1996) and registered two tackles. He also played two seasons in the NFL Europe with the Frankfurt Galaxy.

Coaching career

Kiel Baltic Hurricanes
Following his playing career, Reed began his coaching career as a defensive backs coach with the Kiel Baltic Hurricanes in 2000.

Richmond
In 2000, Reed joined the University of Richmond as their wide receivers, tight ends and defensive backs coach.

Philadelphia Eagles
In 2002, Reed was hired by the Philadelphia Eagles to be their defensive backs and special teams coach under head coach Andy Reid.

NC State
In 2007, Reed joined North Carolina State University as their defensive backs coach.

Clemson
In 2013, Reed was named the defensive backs coach at Clemson University under head coach Dabo Swinney.

On December 14, 2021, Reed was promoted to special teams coordinator and cornerbacks coach.

References

External links
Clemson Tigers bio
NC State Wolfpack bio

1972 births
African-American coaches of American football
African-American players of American football
American football defensive backs
Carolina Panthers players
Clemson Tigers football coaches
Frankfurt Galaxy players
Living people
Philadelphia Eagles coaches
NC State Wolfpack football coaches
Players of American football from Wilmington, Delaware
Boston College Eagles football players
Salesianum School alumni